Dovre is a municipality in Innlandet county, Norway. It is located in the traditional district of Gudbrandsdal. The administrative centre of the municipality is the village of Dovre. Other villages in Dovre include Dombås and Hjerkinn. The municipality is bordered on the north by Oppdal municipality (in Trøndelag county), on the east by Folldal, on the south by Sel and Vågå, and on the northwest by Lesja.

The  municipality is the 69th largest by area out of the 356 municipalities in Norway. Dovre is the 252nd most populous municipality in Norway with a population of 2,498.

General information

The municipality of Dovre was established in 1861 when it was separated from the municipality of Lesja. Initially, the new municipality had 2,537 residents. On 1 January 1970, the three western farms at Bergsengseter (population: 11) were transferred from Dovre to the neighboring Folldal Municipality.

Coat of arms

The coat of arms was granted on 11 July 1986. The official blazon is "Argent, a muskox sable". This means the arms have a field (background) with a tincture of argent which means it is colored white most of the time, but if it is made out of metal, then silver is used. The charge is a muskox that is black with yellow horn. It is displayed statant to dexter. The muskox is an animal typical for the northern parts of Canada, Alaska, and Greenland. It is not native to Norway, but in 1932, ten muskoxen were released near Dovre. The number has increased to around 300 (in 2013), and the animal is thus a typical symbol for the municipality. The arms were designed by Einar Skjervold.

Name

The municipality was named after the old Dovre farm since the first Dovre Church was built there. The name belongs to a group of Scandinavian toponyms that the Swedish linguist Elof Hellquist has derived from a Proto-Norse , and linguists have further derived them from the old Proto-Indo-European root  - (cf. PIE , "deep"), a root that is also attested in German Topel ("forested valley") and Old Slavic dublŭ ("hole"). There are several place names in Denmark, Norway and Sweden that are identified as related to Dovre:
Denmark
Døvregaarde in the narrow valley Døvredal, in Bodilsker parish on Bornholm.
Dover a place with steep slopes in Lintrup parish in Haderslev amt.
Dovergaard located among deeply cut banks of a small stream, in Skipdsted parish near Aalborg.
Dover vestergaard, an old farm name, and the bay Doverkil, with hilly terrain, in Ydby parish, near Thisted.
Dover sogn a parish in Hjelmslev hundred in Århus amt. It has a hilly terrain with steep slopes.

Norway
Dovre herred. ON Dofrar was originally the name of an old farm and it later became the name for the entire hundred.
Dofrar was the name of a lost farm in Biri hundred, but it survives in the name of a local meadow Dåvreænga.
Døvre, where the name is derived from dofrar and vin ("meadow").

Sweden
Dovra sjöar ("lakes of Dovra"), which are three lakes (Northern/Upper, Middle, and Southern) in a fissure valley in Närke.
Ödesdovra, a farm located at the southernmost extension of the valley.
Dovern, a long and narrow inlet of the lake Glan in Östergötland, and there is a strait named Doversund and a farm named Doverstorp.

The name has also been given to giants in Scandinavian legends. The name has been given to the giant Dofri, at Dovrefjell, who was helped by Harald Fairhair and in return assisted him all his life. In Närke, the Dovra lakes were attributed to the giantess Dovra who wept for her husband.

Churches
The Church of Norway has two parishes within the municipality of Dovre. It is part of the Nord-Gudbrandsdal prosti (deanery) in the Diocese of Hamar.

Dovre Church (Dovre kirke) was built in 1736. The bell tower was added early in the 19th century. It was built based upon designed by Jesper Mikkelson Rusten. It was constructed of wood and has protected status.

Eystein Church (Eysteinskirka) in Dovre was built in 1969 as a church for pilgrims and travelers on the Pilgrim's Route. The church lies near the juncture of the boundaries of Innlandet and Trøndelag counties. Eystein Church is built of concrete using stone and sand brought from the Hjerkinn. The plans for the church were designed by architect Magnus Poulsson (1881-1958).

History

People have lived at Dovre for about 6,000 years. In the Stone Age, they were primarily hunters and fishermen. Approximately 2,000 years ago, the first farms were developed at this location.

Dovre is mentioned in Heimskringla (The Chronicle of the Kings of Norway) by Snorri Sturluson. In 1021, King Olaf laid hold of all the best men, both at Lesja and Dovre, and forced them either to receive Christianity or suffer death, if they were not so lucky as to escape.

The Pilgrim's Route (Old King's Road) between Oslo and Trondheim in the 16th century passed through the Gudbrandsdal valley. After leaving the Lågen river valley (downriver from present day Dombås) the road passed over the Dovrefjell mountains into the present-day municipality of Dovre. The heavy stream of annual pilgrims who visited the shrine of St. Olaf in Trondheim prior to the Protestant Reformation resulted in the construction of mountain stations along the route where the pilgrims could find food and shelter. In speaking of this route, Gjerset quotes Peder Claussøn Friis as writing:

The Battle of Kringen (Slaget ved Kringen) took place in August 1612, just downstream of Dovre, where the Scottish force stayed on 24 August 1612.

Government
All municipalities in Norway, including Dovre, are responsible for primary education (through 10th grade), outpatient health services, senior citizen services, unemployment and other social services, zoning, economic development, and municipal roads. The municipality is governed by a municipal council of elected representatives, which in turn elects a mayor.  The municipality falls under the Vestre Innlandet District Court and the Eidsivating Court of Appeal.

Municipal council
The municipal council  of Dovre is made up of 17 representatives that are elected to four year terms. The party breakdown of the council is as follows:

Mayors
The mayors of Dovre (incomplete list):

1946-1947: Albert Guddal (Ap)
1948-1955: Paul P. Enersgård (Ap)
1956-1962: Karl P. Schanke (Ap)
1962-1967: Erland Rykhus (Ap)
1968-1975: Martin Leren (Ap)
1976-1983: Gunder Bentdal (Ap)
1984-1991: Arne Kåre Os (Ap)
1992: Harald Hammerstad (Ap)
1992-1995: Melvin Rykhus (Ap)
1995-2007: Erland Løkken (Sp)
2007-2018: Bengt Fasteraune (Sp)
2018-2019: Oddny Garmo (Sp)
2019–present: 	Astrid Skomakerstuen Ruste (LL)

Geography
The municipality is a very mountainous area. Most of the residents live in the lower valley areas along the Gudbrandsdalslågen river. The Dovrefjell, Rondane, Smiubelgen, and Sunndalsfjella mountains are all partially located within the municipality.

National Parks
Rondane National Park, which lies partially in Dovre, was the first Norwegian National Park, established on 21 December 1962. In 2003, Rondane National Park was enlarged and smaller areas of nature protection were opened or enlarged.
Dovre National Park lies primarily in Dovre, although part lies in Folldal municipality. It was established in 2003. The park is located between Rondane National Park, which lies to its southeast, and Dovrefjell-Sunndalsfjella National Park on its northwest.
Dovrefjell-Sunndalsfjella National Park was founded in 2002 and encompasses part of the former Dovrefjell National Park area (as founded in 1974). It includes the whole Dovrefjell mountain range.

Climate
The Dovre area is in a valley at fairly high altitude and isolated from the sea by mountain ranges, giving some rain shadow effect for Dovre. Dovre, with the town Dombås, has a subarctic climate (Dfc) with sparse precipitation. The driest season is late winter and spring, and the wettest season is summer. April on average sees just  precipitaiton, while the wettest months July and August get almost four times as much.

International relations
Dovre has sister city agreements with the following places:
 : Gronau, Lower Saxony, Germany
 : Leppävirta, Itä-Suomi, Finland
 : Storfors, Värmland County, Sweden

Notable residents

 Georg Sauerwein (1831–1904) a German publisher, polyglot, poet, and linguist, lived in Dovre
 Peter P. Lee (1861 in Dovre – 1937) American politician, Mayor of Minot, North Dakota in 1896
 Sigurd Einbu (1866–1946) self-taught astronomer, ran magnetic monitoring station at Dombås from 1916
 Ole Hjellemo (1873 in Dovre – 1938) musician and composer
 Ragnar Solberg (1898 in Dovre – 1967) a Norwegian poet
 Vegard Vigerust (1925 in Dovre – 2020) a Norwegian novelist and poet
 Børt-Erik Thoresen (1932 in Dombås – 2011) a Norwegian TV host and folk singer
 Eli Hagen (born 1947 in Dombås) a TV presenter and personality
 Bengt Fasteraune (born 1964) a Norwegian politician, Mayor of Dovre 2007-2018
 Ivar Michal Ulekleiv (born 1966 in Dombås) a former biathlete, competed at the 1994 Winter Olympics
 Anita Killi (born 1968) animator and film director, runs an animation studio in Dovre

References

External links

Municipal fact sheet from Statistics Norway 

The Battle of Kringen

 
Municipalities of Innlandet
1861 establishments in Norway